André Moynet (July 19, 1921 – May 2, 1993) was a much decorated French wartime fighter pilot who moved on to become a test pilot and an entrepreneur-businessman. He was also a politician.

Biography
Moynet volunteered for military service on 26 December 1939, becoming a fighter pilot. As a member of the Normandie-Niémen squadron he recorded 115 aerial missions accounting for 150 wartime flying hours.

He entered politics in 1946 initially as an independent deputy representing Saône-et-Loire. On 12 November 1954, he was appointed a member of the Mendès France government, as a secretary of state and Secretary of State for Sport with responsibility for coordinating the Problems of Youth.

Simultaneously he continued his aviation career, as a test pilot, participating in the development of Sud Aviation’s Caravelle. He also did work for Matra and even gave his name to the Moynet M.360 Jupiter, a small propeller driven aircraft.

Moynet was also instrumental in Matra’s move into the automobile business, being responsible for the conception and development in 1968 of a Sports prototype which was developed to achieve a class win (1600–2000 cc) at Le Mans in 1975 (drivers: Michèle Mouton, Marianne Hoepfner and Christine Dacremont). He had previously driven a D.B. to victory in the S750 class at the 1953 24 Hours of Le Mans alongside the D.B. marque's co-founder René Bonnet.

In 1968 Moynet was appointed as a colonel in the Air Force.

Relocating to the south of the country, he was elected mayor of the small town of Biot in 1971, holding office for a full term until 1977. He died in Nice on 2 May 1993, and his funeral was held in Antibes. He is, however, buried at the cemetery in Biot.

Honours 
• Grand Officer of the Légion d'honneur
• Compagnon de la Libération (Decree : 17 November 1945)
• Croix de guerre 1939–1945
• Médaille de la Résistance
• Médaille de l'Aéronautique
• Silver Star (USA)
• Air Medal (USA)
• Order of War for National Salvation (1st, 2nd and 3rd class) (Soviet Union)
•  Order of the Red Banner (Soviet Union)
• Medal of the Resistance (Poland)
• Order of the White Eagle (Serbia)
• Order of Aeronautical Merit (Brazil)

External links  
Bio sur le site de l'Ordre de la Libération

Bibliography 
Claude-Henry Leconte, André Moynet, Pilote de combat, Paris, éditions de la pensée moderne, 1955, 222 p.

1921 births
1993 deaths
People from Saint-Mandé
Politicians from Île-de-France
National Centre of Independents and Peasants politicians
Independent Republicans politicians
Deputies of the 1st National Assembly of the French Fourth Republic
Deputies of the 2nd National Assembly of the French Fourth Republic
Deputies of the 3rd National Assembly of the French Fourth Republic
Deputies of the 1st National Assembly of the French Fifth Republic
Deputies of the 2nd National Assembly of the French Fifth Republic
French racing drivers
24 Hours of Le Mans drivers
French military personnel of World War II
Companions of the Liberation
Grand Officiers of the Légion d'honneur
Sportspeople from Val-de-Marne